Elif Güneri (born 9 October 1987) is a Turkish boxer.

She won a medal at the 2019 AIBA Women's World Boxing Championships.

References

1987 births
Living people
AIBA Women's World Boxing Championships medalists
Turkish women boxers
People from Karabük
Light-heavyweight boxers
20th-century Turkish sportswomen
21st-century Turkish sportswomen